In enzymology, a cytosine deaminase is an enzyme that catalyzes the chemical reaction

cytosine + H2O  uracil + NH3

Thus, the two substrates of this enzyme are cytosine and H2O, whereas its two products are uracil and NH3.

This enzyme belongs to the family of hydrolases, those acting on carbon-nitrogen bonds other than peptide bonds, specifically in cyclic amidines.  The systematic name of this enzyme class is cytosine aminohydrolase. This enzyme is also called isocytosine deaminase.  This enzyme participates in pyrimidine metabolism.

Structural studies

References

 
 

EC 3.5.4
Enzymes of known structure